The Pakoka River is a river of the Waikato Region of New Zealand's North Island. It flows southwest from its source southeast of Raglan to reach the northeastern end of the Aotea Harbour.

Geology 
The most notable features of the Pakoka valley were formed by Upper Pliocene–Lower Pleistocene Okete Volcanics about 2 million years ago. These rocks form the top of the Wharauroa Plateau, where the Pakoka rises. They also flowed down from a vent about a kilometre northwest of Bridal Veil Falls to block the valley and form the falls.

A rock arch and several notable bluffs are formed of late Whaingaroan Ahirau Sandstone formed about 28 million years ago. Although classified as sandstone, it looks more like limestone, with 40-60% calcium carbonate content and lapiez features in massive (lacking internal structures), blue-grey, calcareous, fine sandstone.

Apart from recent alluvial deposits, the other main rock in the valley is Hauturu Sandstone, which is mid to late Whaingaroan, about 30 million years old. It is commonly knobbly due to resistant bands and lenses of hard calcareous sandstone in soft friable quartzofeldspathic sand.

Biota 
About two-thirds of the catchment is pasture, with the rest under trees and scrub. Less than 10% of the catchment was fenced from livestock in 2014. New Zealand fernbird and Spotless crake have been recorded in the catchment.

A Regional Council study describes the vegetation around the estuary - "Te Heru Point and up towards Pakoka Landing, a forest of akeake, kanuka and kowhai lines the estuary arm. Spartina is present on the [right bank] upstream of Ohiawhakainga Creek. Patches of sea meadow are found at the mouth of the Motakotako Creek in front of the rushes. The saline influence on the vegetation finishes just upstream of the road bridge at Pakoka Landing. Moving downstream on the true-left bank are bands of saltmarsh ribbonwood with marsh clubrush and raupo wetland behind. Small patches of seagrass are found on the mud flats around the corner where the river widens out. The farmland is not fenced along the [left bank] and stock access is potentially a problem. A mature (~10 years?) flowering mangrove is upstream of Karetoto Island. A small patch of saltwater paspalum is found immediately opposite the island. A patch of seagrass lies behind the oyster bank at Mowhiti Point. The harbour edge is lined by a thin band of rush."

Mitigation funding from Te Uku Wind Farm and support from farmers and Regional Council have resulted in Whaingaroa Harbour Care putting up 15 km of fencing to protect the river and its tributaries and planting 150,000 trees in the valley above Bridal Veil Falls. This has been followed by a possum and rat control project jointly with the Department of Conservation.

Six sites were surveyed for the windfarm and given Stream Health Index scores between 60 and 170.5 (poor to excellent). Their 2006 survey identified these stream quality indicator species in the Pakoka, - the higher the score, the more sensitive these macroinvertebrates are to pollution.

The NIWA Freshwater Fish Database shows the Pakoka has longfin eel, koura, Cran's Bully (Gobiomorphus basalis) and redfin bully, banded kokopu and smelt.

Bridges 
The Pakoka is bridged by Plateau Road, Kawhia Road and Te Papatapu Road, which is the lowest bridge, being alongside Pakoka Landing. That lowest bridge was opened in 1922 and seems to have been used by a motor service from February that year.

Gallery

See also
List of rivers of New Zealand

References

External links
Pakoka River  1:50,000 map at NZTopomaps

Rivers of Waikato
Waikato District
Rivers of New Zealand